Colonel Carlos Concha Torres Airport  is an airport serving the Pacific coastal city of Esmeraldas, capital of the Esmeraldas Province of Ecuador. Established in 1940 as General Rivadeneira Airport, the airport was renovated between 2012 and 2013, receiving a new terminal and a lengthened runway.

History
The airport was established on 25 March 1940, upon the upgrading of the runway. It was originally named in honor of José Enrique Rivadeneira, an inspector general of the Ecuadorian navy who died in a 1939 plane crash.

The Ecuadorian government renovated the airport in 2014 as part of a plan to modernise the country's airports and attract more tourists and businesses to Ecuador. It also held a contest in which the people of Esmeraldas voted on a new namesake. Carlos Concha Torres (es), an army commander who led a war against President Leónidas Plaza in the 1910s, received the most votes.

Facilities
The newly constructed passenger terminal was inaugurated on 14 January 2014 by President Rafael Correa.  The terminal has a capacity for 275 passengers and can handle 250,000 per year.

Additional work was completed on taxiways, fuel plant, and other facilities. The construction work cost over US$45 million and lasted 17 months.

The Esmeraldas VOR-DME (Ident: ESV) and non-directional beacon (Ident: ESM) are located on the field.

Airlines and Destinations

Passenger

See also
Transport in Ecuador
List of airports in Ecuador

References

External links

OpenStreetMap - Esmeraldas
OurAirports - Esmeraldas
SkyVector - Carlos Concha Airport

 Video by the Ecuadoran Transport and Public Works Ministry about the 2014 renovation

Airports in Ecuador
Buildings and structures in Esmeraldas Province